Ethmia sibirica is a moth in the family Depressariidae. It is found in the Russian Far East (East Sayan).

References

Moths described in 1975
sibirica